Dmitry Alekseyevich Ogay (born 14 May 1960) is a Kazakhstani professional football manager of Korean descent. He is one of the most successful coaches in Kazakhstan. Ogay played seven seasons in the Soviet Top League with FC Kairat and FC Pakhtakor Tashkent, appearing in over 100 league matches.

Managerial career
Following a surprise defeat to Kyzylzhar in the Kazakhstan Cup, Ogay left FC Tobol by mutual consent on 28 April 2016.

Honours
 FC Irtysh
 Kazakhstan Premier League: 2002, 2003
 FC Tobol
 Kazakhstan Cup: 2007
 Intertoto Cup: 2007

References

External links
 Lyakhov.kz Tobol squad 2008 

1960 births
Living people
Soviet footballers
Kazakhstani footballers
Koryo-saram
Kazakhstani people of Korean descent
People from Taraz
FC Kairat players
FC Shakhter Karagandy players
FC Taraz players
Pakhtakor Tashkent FK players
FC Caspiy players
Expatriate football managers in Russia
Kazakhstani football managers
FC Ural Yekaterinburg managers
FC Tobol managers
FC Kyzylzhar managers
FC Irtysh Pavlodar managers
FC Neftekhimik Nizhnekamsk managers
FC Kairat managers
FC Taraz managers
Association football defenders